Hapta Kangjeibung is one of the world's oldest polo ground, situated in Imphal, Manipur, India. It is also main venue of Manipur's Sangai festival starting 21 November to 30 November each year.

History
The term Kangjeibung means field or ground used for playing. Kangjeibung  is mainly for playing Polo.
There are 3 Kangjeibung in Imphal.
 Manung Kangjeibung - Kangjeibung inside Kangla Palace.
 Mapan Kangjeibung - Kangjeibung just outside, west of Kangla Palace
 Hapta Kangjeibung - Kangjeibung near present Manipur Palace.

See also
 Polo
 Polo in India

References

External links

Entertainment venues in India